M-Net (an abbreviation of Electronic Media Network) is a South African pay television channel established by Naspers in 1986. The channel broadcasts both local and international programming, including general entertainment, children's series, sport and movies. While the TV signal is generally encrypted, M-Net showed some programmes 'free to air' in its "Open Time" slot between 5 p.m. and 7 pm, until the slot closed on 1 April 2007.

In the early 1990s, M-Net added a second analogue channel called Community Services Network (CSN), and began digital broadcasting via satellite to the rest of Africa, via its sister company MultiChoice. With the introduction of MultiChoice's multi-channel digital satellite TV service, DStv, in 1995, several different channels have been created to complement the original M-Net channel, including the now-defunct M-Net Series and several film/movie channels based on genre and preference.

History

Early years
The idea of a pay-TV network in South Africa came to life in the mid-1980s, when Nasionale Pers (Naspers) — headed by executive Koos Bekker — started to promote the idea to the country's other three largest media corporations: Times Media Ltd (now Avusa/BDFM), Argus (now the Independent Group) and Perskor (which is now defunct).

The newspapers and magazines published by Naspers had lost a lot of advertising revenue to the SABC after the arrival of television and for this reason, according to some sources, the National Party government wanted Naspers to run its own television network. 

Initially, the plan was for M-Net to be jointly owned by the four media corporations, with the Natal Witness also having a small share in the station. However, as time went on, the project became that of Naspers only.

In October 1986, they started broadcasting for 12 hours a day, to about 500 households who had bought decoders. (Their aim at that stage was to sell 9,000 decoders per month.) The service used the Oak Orion scrambling system, and the decoders were manufactured in South Africa by the local affiliate of Matsushita Electric.

Although it was subscription-based, the Broadcasting Authority granted them a one-hour time slot each day, in which the channel could broadcast unencrypted, free-to-air content, in order to promote itself and attract potential subscribers. In 1987, the Cabinet also approved an arrangement under which the SABC was required to make its TV4 channel available to M-Net between 6 and 7pm. This time slot became known as Open Time, but was only meant to be temporary — M-Net was supposed to close Open Time immediately when it had 150,000 subscribers.

At the end of its first year, they recorded a loss of R37 million. However, it pushed forward and eventually, the public started taking notice. After two years, the loss was turned into a R20 million profit. In 1988, the channel launched Carte Blanche, a multi-award-winning actuality program hosted by Derek Watts and Ruda Landman. In only a few years, Carte Blanche became famous for its investigative journalism. In the process, the show also uncovered many of South Africa's most famous scandals of human rights abuse, corruption and consumer affairs.

1989 saw the launch of M-Net SuperSport, which went on to become South Africa's (and Sub-Saharan Africa's) first dedicated sports channel which spawned into sports-specific channels from 2003 onward.

Recent history
1990 was the first year that they made a profit and also the year that saw a few major changes for the channel. It launched K-TV, a daily time slot specialising in kids' entertainment, and Open Time was expanded from the initial one hour per day, to two. They applied for a licence to broadcast news and the application was granted in December 1990. (Former State President P.W. Botha once claimed that "M-Net would not broadcast news as long as he was State President.") but during June 1991, they announced that they were putting their plans for news broadcasts aside and that, instead, more money would be invested in local productions, including South Africa's first local soap opera Egoli, which started in May 1992 and ended in April 2010. However, they began re-broadcasting BBC World Service Television (now BBC World News) that same year.

M-Net SuperSport changed its name in 1994 to SuperSport only, to create a more recognizable brand. During that year it broadcast live coverage of South Africa's test cricket series in Australia for the first time. At the same time, Hugh Bladen and Naas Botha — two of the channel's most colourful rugby commentators — joined SuperSport. By that time, its sports coverage became very impressive, including the US Masters, the FA Cup Finals, the Indy 500, the US PGA Championship, Wimbledon, the Tour de France, MotoGP and an ever-expanding rugby package. In 1995, SuperSport started broadcasting 24 hours per day on M-Net's spare channel, the Community Service Network, which paved the way for a 24-hour multi-channel sports network. When rugby became a full professional sport in 1995, most of the broadcasting rights in the Southern Hemisphere were sold to Rupert Murdoch's News Corporation. In response, they started negotiating with NewsCorp in August 1995 and in February the following year, SuperSport was granted sole broadcasting rights to both the Super 12 and Tri Nations rugby tournaments. It was a major breakthrough for the channel as well as SuperSport, which had by then expanded to sports-and-leagues-specific TV channels on DStv and GOtv, MultiChoice's satellite TV services.

High definition
Delivery of high-definition content started with the launch of DStv's first high definition decoder the HD PVR, XtraView and the first HD channel, M-Net HD. M-Net began broadcasting a 720p high definition channel in 2010, which is available for HD-PVR subscribers; the standard definition channel for non-HD-PVR subscribers is merely downscaled at the provider from the HD feed rather than having a devoted analog channel. In 2012, the original film/movie channels were expanded to 6 channels which grouped films according to genre/preference.

M-Net channels

M-Net 
The original M-Net channel broadcasts general entertainment, as well as premiere movies, documentaries, music specials and first-run TV series. The channel has a timeshift service, a terrestrial service and a CSN in South Africa. In other African countries the channel broadcasts exclusively on the DStv Service with two different feeds, M-Net East for East Africa and M-Net West for West Africa. These feeds broadcasts nearly the same content, though the West African feed is 2 hours behind the East African feed as programmes are scheduled based on the local time zones of the regions (EAT and WAT respectively) except for some live programmes. Advertising on the East feed is targeted at Kenyan viewers while the West feed is targeted at Nigerian Viewers. Over the course of several years, M-Net has launched numerous sister channels. In DStv, the channel is only available to the high tier package Premium as it contains expensive content.

M-Net Edge

On 31 March 2017, M-Net Edge programs were moved to M-Net as part of a merge and various other channels from M-Net. On 29 January 2018, Vuzu AMP/Vuzu Amp was rebranded as 1Magic.

M-Net +1

The time shift channel, M-Net +1 was launched also for DStv Premium customers since 1 June 2016 on DStv channel 901. However, the time-shifted channel was discontinued on 16 May 2021 due to increase of content preference by DStv Premium Subscribers on the DStv app.

M-Net Movies

The original two movie channels, Movie Magic 1 and Movie Magic 2, launched in 1995 to coincide with the launch of DStv, were renamed M-Net Movies 1 and M-Net Movies 2, respectively, in 2005. Two additional movie channels, M-Net Movies Stars (previously M-Net Stars which launched in 2009) and actionX (which was renamed M-Net Action in 2008), were later launched. In October 2012, the channels were expanded to six which grouped films according to genre and preference. The 7 film/movie channels were later reconsolidated into 4 numeric channels:

1Magic and Me

Most of the programmes broadcast are unique to M-Net Series but some are rebroadcasts of episodes previously shown on M-Net.

A single series channel known as The Series Channel (renamed as M-Net Series in 2005) was introduced in April 1998 as a sister channel to the original M-Net channel. On 9 July 2013, this channel was split into three, namely:

M-Net Series Showcase, which was broadcast in high definition, previously served as the primary series channel on which most new content unique to Series was broadcast.
 M-Net Series Reality broadcast talk shows and other reality media.
M-Net Series Zone which served as a catch-up channel, and featured previous seasons of shows. Several TV shows also ran back-to-back in marathon blocks.

On 11 September 2014, it was announced that Showcase and Reality would be discontinued and replaced with two new channels, Vuzu Amp and M-Net Edge, on 20 and 13 October, respectively. Only one channel of the original three, M-Net Series Zone, remained. The standalone channel is reminiscent of the initial channel, in that it airs shows that previously aired on the main M-Net channel. It was rebranded M-Net City in 2015.

M-Net City, along with Vuzu, was closed on 29 October 2021 to be replaced by ME on its EPG slot.

KykNet

KykNET, which broadcasts solely in Afrikaans, was launched in October 1999. The channel features general entertainment, series, informative programs and music. KykNET also has two sister channels, KykNet & Kie and KykNet Musiek. DStv announced on 16 July 2014 that kykNet would be broadcast in high definition as of 12 August 2014.

It was launched in the UK on TalkTalk's IPTV service, TalkTalk Plus TV, in October 2013. However, it was dropped by TalkTalk in December 2015. A kykNet International service is now available online to subscribers in selected countries in North America, Europe and Australasia via the Showmax platform.

Vuzu
Vuzu, originally launched as Go in 2003, had a strong focus on Southern African youth, specifically preteens, teens and the 20–49 demographics, similar to some popular American TV Channels such as Bravo, FX, BET, The CW, NBC, TNT and many others. A sister channel, Vuzu Amp, was launched in October 2014, which was later relaunched as 1Magic.

The channel was shut down, along with M-Net City, on 29 October 2021 to be replaced by Me

Mzansi Magic
Mzansi Magic features original South African series, movies, music, documentaries and reality shows. It has two sister channels, Mzansi Magic Music, Mzansi Wethu and Mzansi Biskop.

Africa Magic
Africa Magic, which started off as a single channel of the same name, is a brand owned by M-Net and MultiChoice and now comprises 7 channels. The first Africa Magic channel was launched in July 2003 as a movie channel and over the next decade, the brand expanded to include 6 more channels comprising movies, television shows and general entertainment. Africa Magic currently broadcasts in more than 50 African countries. The channels include Africa Magic Family, Africa Magic Showcase, Africa Magic Yoruba, Africa Magic Igbo, Africa Magic Hausa. Africa Magic Epic and Africa Magic Urban. Africa Magic is also responsible for the annual Africa Magic Viewers' Choice Awards (AMVCAs), the biggest celebration of film and television talent in Africa.

Maisha Magic
Maisha Magic comprises four channels, Maisha Magic East & Maisha Magic Plus for Kenyan audiences and Maisha Magic Bongo & Maisha Magic Poa for Tanzanian audiences. They focus on East African movies, series and music. It was initially launched as Africa Magic Swahili but was later rebranded as Maisha Magic before it became Maisha Magic Swahili then rebranded again as Maisha Magic East. Maisha Magic Bongo have been working with many producers from Tanzania like Mtitu Game 1st Quality, Steps Entertainment, Halisi Film, Joh Films, Severini Film Entertainment, 360 Production etc.

In 2021, the brand introduced Maisha Magic Movies showcasing the best Ugandan, Kenyan and Tanzanian movies.

Channel O
Channel O is a present music channel with a strong focus on urban music genres. It also holds the annual Channel O Music Video Awards ceremony where artists are awarded for their outstanding contribution to music.

SuperSport
SuperSport is a group of sport television channels carried on DStv and GOtv. It provides sports content in South Africa and many other African countries.

Novela Magic
Novela Magic celebrates unique African Storytelling and showcases local content and African stories made by African talent by bringing together a rage of content from across the region on one platform.

All HD channels are aired in 1080i but are downscaled to SD if the subscriber isn't in possession of an HD or Explora decoder.

Present programming

Domestic

Game shows 
 Survivor South Africa

General entertainment 
 Love Island: South Africa
 MasterChef South Africa
 My Kitchen Rules: South Africa
 The Bachelor SA
 The Bachelorette SA

News and current affairs 
 Carte Blanche

Dramas 

 Desert Rose
 Gomora
 Inconceivable
 Is'Thunzi
 Legacy
 Lioness
 Recipes for Love and Murder
 Reyka
 Strangers You Know
 Tracers

Music 
 Idols South Africa

Global

Sitcoms 
 Avenue 5
 B Positive
 Broke
 Call Me Kat
 Ghosts
 Man with a Plan
 Mom
 The Conners
 The Goldbergs
 The Unicorn
 United States of Al
 United We Fall
 Young Sheldon

Dramas 
 9-1-1
 9-1-1: Lone Star
 A Million Little Things
 And Just Like That...
 American Horror Story
 Babylon Berlin
 Billions
 Blue Bloods
 Chicago Fire
 Chicago Med
 Chicago P.D.
 Clarice
 CSI: Vegas
 Dexter: New Blood
 FBI
 FBI: International
 FBI: Most Wanted
 Grey's Anatomy
 House of the Dragon
 In the Dark
 In Treatment
 La Brea
 Law & Order
 Law & Order: Organized Crime
 Mare of Easttown
 Nancy Drew
 NCIS
 NCIS: Hawai'i
 NCIS: Los Angeles
 NCIS: New Orleans
 New Amsterdam
 Ordinary Joe
 Prodigal Son
 Ragdoll
 Riverdale
 SEAL Team
 Shameless
 Station 19
 The Flight Attendant
 The Good Doctor
 The Good Fight
 The Gilded Age
 The Offer
 The Republic of Sarah
 The Time Traveler's Wife
 The Twilight Zone
 This Is Us
 Walker
 Westworld
 Why Women Kill
 Yellowjackets
 Zoey's Extraordinary Playlist

Reality/unscripted 
 Celebrity Family Feud
 Ellen's Game of Games
 Last Week Tonight with John Oliver 
 Mental Samurai
 The Kelly Clarkson Show 
 The Late Late Show with James Corden
 The Masked Singer
 Whose Line Is It Anyway?

Award Shows 
 Emmy Awards
 Grammy Awards
 Golden Globe Awards

Kids Shows 
SpongeBob SquarePants
Stormworld

Past programming

Domestic

Soap operas 
 Binnelanders
 Egoli: Place of Gold

Game shows 
 Deal or No Deal
 Who Wants to Be a Millionaire?
 You Bet Your Life

Global

Soap operas 
 Loving

Dramas 
 24
 Alcatraz
 American Gods
 Angel
 Anne of Green Gables: The Sequel
 Are You Smarter than a 5th Grader?
 Arrested Development
 Bad Girls
 Baywatch
 Beauty & the Beast
 Beauty and the Beast (1987)
 Believe
 Beverly Hills 90210
 Body of Proof
 Boston Legal
 Brand New Life
 Buffy the Vampire Slayer
 Charmed
 China Beach
 Chuck
 City of Angels
 Cracker
 Crime Story
 Cross of Fire
 CSI: Crime Scene Investigation
 CSI: Cyber
 CSI: Miami
 CSI: NY
 Damages
 Darlings of the Gods
 Desperate Housewives
 Dharma & Greg
 Diagnosis: Murder
 Dirt
 ER
 Everwood
 Firefly
 First Wave
 Foyle's War
 Game of Thrones
 Gilmore Girls
 Glee
 Good Advice
 Hart to Hart
 High Mountain Rangers
 Homefront
 Inspector Rex
 iZombie
 Jane the Virgin
 Justified
 Katy Keene Land's End Lie to Me Lights Out (2011)
 Madam Secretary Midnight Caller Moonlighting My Name Is Earl Nip/Tuck NYPD Blue Ohara Over There P.S. I Luv U Parks and Recreation Pensacola: Wings of Gold Prison Break Private Practice Raising Hope Reign Rescue Me Roots: The Next Generations Rush Sex and the City Silent Witness Sons of Anarchy Spearfield's Daughter Spin City Still Standing Stingers Sweet Justice Sweet Valley High Teen Wolf Terriers The 100 The Adventurer The Bernie Mac Show The Bill The Campbells The Cloning of Joanna May The Commish The Darling Buds of May The Hardy Boys The Hitchhiker The Littlest Victims The Messengers The Net The New Adventures of Robin Hood The Nightmare Years The Originals The Riches The River Kings The Secret Life of Us The Shield The Swiss Family Robinson (1975)
 The Thanksgiving Promise The Vampire Diaries The Wire The Wonder Years Thief True Blood Ugly Betty V.I.P. War of the Worlds Water Rats WIOU Yes, Dear You and Me and Uncle Bob Sitcoms 
 3rd Rock from the Sun 'Allo 'Allo! Almost Home Amen Anything but Love Bagdad Cafe Blossom Boy Meets World Charles in Charge Clueless Coach Cosby Cybill Dave's World Dear John (USA)
 Designing Women Dinosaurs Dream On Drexell's Class Duet Empty Nest Father Ted Friends Full House (1987)
 Gimme Gimme Gimme Grace Under Fire Grounded for Life Hangin' with Mr. Cooper Hearts Afire Herman's Head Home Improvement Honey, I Shrunk the Kids: The TV Show It's Always Sunny in Philadelphia Kristin Legit Life with Bonnie Lucky Major Dad Malcolm in the Middle Malibu, CA Married... with Children Mr. Bean Newhart Nurses Oh Baby Only Fools and Horses Open House Perfect Strangers Phenom Son of the Beach Starved Step by Step Suddenly Susan Testees That '70s Show The Brittas Empire The Fresh Prince of Bel-Air The Good Life (1994)
 The Hogan Family The Jeffersons The League The Millers The Mommies The Torkelsons The Upper Hand Three's Company Titus Too Close for Comfort Two of a Kind United States of Tara Veronica's Closet Where I Live Wilfred Wings Woops! Yes, Minister Zoe, Duncan, Jack and Jane Cooking 
 Floyd on Fish Television films 
 Clarence Fatal Deception: Mrs. Lee Harvey Oswald In the Arms of a Killer In the Gloaming In the Line of Duty: The F.B.I. Murders Stop at Nothing Stormy Weathers Sudie and Simpson To Catch a Killer Tonya and Nancy: The Inside Story Documentaries 
 48 Hours Big Cat Diary Night Walk Supersense The Civil War Wildlife on One Sci-fi 
 Amazing Stories First Wave Roswell Anthology 
 Carol & Company Ghost Story The Twilight Zone Reality 
 America's Funniest People America's Next Top Model Boy Band Cedric's Barber Battle Extreme Makeover Fame, Fortune and Romance Lifestyles of the Rich and Famous Little Big Shots The Jamie Kennedy Experiment Animation 
 2DTV Futurama God, the Devil and Bob Meet the Raisins! South Park The Simpsons Wallace and Gromit Lifestyle 
 Lifestyles of the Rich and Famous Children's 

 100 Deeds for Eddie McDowd A Bunch of Munsch A Miss Mallard Mystery A Pup Named Scooby-Doo A.J.'s Time Travelers Aaahh!!! Real Monsters ABC Afterschool Special ABC Weekend Special Ace Lightning Ace Ventura: Pet Detective Action Man (1995)
 Action Man (2000)
 ALF: The Animated Series AlfTales Alien All Grown Up! All That Alvin and the Chipmunks Amazing Animals Anatole Angela Anaconda Angelina Ballerina Animal Mechanicals Animaniacs Anne of Green Gables: The Animated Series Aquila Astro Boy (2003)
 Avatar: The Last Airbender Babar Babar and the Adventures of Badou Back at the Barnyard Bad Dog Bakugan Battle Brawlers Bamboo Bears
 Bananas in Pyjamas
 The Barbie Movies
 Barbie and the Rockers Specials
 Barney & Friends
 Batman Beyond
 Batman: The Animated Series
 Battletoads
 Beakman's World
 Beast Wars: Transformers
 Beetle Bailey
 Being Ian
 Ben & Izzy
 Betty's Bunch
 Beverly Hills Teens
 Beyblade
 Big Bad Beetleborgs
 Bill Nye, the Science Guy
 Billy the Cat
 Birdz
 Blaster's Universe
 Blazing Dragons
 Bo on the Go
 Bob the Builder
 Bobby's World
 Braceface
 Breaker High
 Budgie the Little Helicopter
 Bugs Bunny
 Bump in the Night
 Bumpety Boo
 Bushfire Moon
 Caitlin's Way
 Camp Candy
 Captain N: The Game Master
 The Adventures of Captain Pugwash
 Captain Simian & the Space Monkeys
 Captain Zed and the Zee Zone
 Caribou Kitchen
 Carl Squared
 Casper and Friends
 CatDog
 CBS Schoolbreak Special
 CBS Storybreak
 Cédric
 ChalkZone
 Channel Umptee-3
 Chip 'n Dale Rescue Rangers
 Christopher Crocodile
 Chuck Finn
 Chuggington
 City of Friends
 Clang Invasion
 Class of the Titans
 Clifford the Big Red Dog
 Conan the Adventurer
 Connie the Cow
 Count Duckula
 Cousin Skeeter
 Cow and Chicken
 Crash Zone
 Creepschool
 Creepy Crawlers
 Crocadoo
 Cubeez
 Cubix'
 Danny Phantom Darkwing Duck Delilah and Julius Dennis the Menace Dex Hamilton: Alien Entomologist Dexter's Laboratory Diabolik Digimon Dinky Di's Dino-Riders Dinosaucers DinoSquad Dinozaurs Diplodos Disney's Adventures of the Gummi Bears Doctor Snuggles Dog City Dog House Donkey Kong Country Don't Eat the Neighbours Dot Double Dragon Doug Dr Otter Dragon Booster DragonFlyz Drake & Josh Dream Street Dreamkix DuckTales (2017) DuckTales Dumb Bunnies Dumbo's Circus Dungeons & Dragons Edgar and Ellen Eekstravaganza Eerie, Indiana: The Other Dimension Emoji Erky Perky Escape of the Artful Dodger Eugénie Sandler P.I. Even Stevens Extreme Dinosaurs Extreme Ghostbusters Fantastic Four Fantastic Max Fantomcat Farmkids Fetch the Vet Fifi and the Flowertots Figure It Out Flight 29 Down Flight Squad Flipper and Lopaka Flying Rhino Junior High Fox's Peter Pan and the Pirates Fraggle Rock Frankenstein's Cat Franklin Franny's Feet Freakazoid! Funky Valley F-Zero G.I. Joe Extreme G.I. Joe: A Real American Hero G2G Gadget Boy & Heather Garfield and Friends Garfield television specials Gargoyles Gaspard and Lisa Genie in the House George and Martha George Shrinks Gerry Anderson's New Captain Scarlet Goof Troop Goosebumps Gordon the Garden Gnome Grossology Groundling Marsh Guess with Jess Gullah Gullah Island Gypsy Girl Hairy Scary Hallo Spencer Hammerman Happily Ever After: Fairy Tales for Every Child Happy Ness: Secret of the Loch Harveytoons Heathcliff and the Catillac Cats Henry's Cat Hey Arnold! Hi-5 Hills End Hilltop Hospital Hollywood 7 Homestar Runner Horrid Henry Horseland Hulk Hogan's Rock 'n' Wrestling Huntik: Secrets & Seekers My Best Friend is an Alien Inspector Gadget Inspector Gadget's Field Trip In The Night Garden Inuk Invader Zim Iron Man Jack Hanna's Animal Adventures Jackie Chan Adventures Jakers! The Adventures of Piggley Winks James Bond Jr. Jane and the Dragon Jay Jay the Jet Plane Jim Henson's The Hoobs Jimbo and the Jet Set Johnny Bravo Johnson and Friends Jonny Quest Journey to the Heart of the World Journey to the West – Legends of the Monkey King Jumanji Just Jordan KaBlam! Katie and Orbie Kenan and Kel Kerching! Kerwhizz Ketchup: Cats Who Cook Kid vs. Kat Kidsongs Kikoriki King Arthur Kipper Kong: The Animated Series L.A. 7 Lapitch the Little Shoemaker Legend of the Dragon Legends of the Hidden Temple Liberty's Kids Life with Louie Lifeboat Luke Looney Tunes Movies Little Bear Little Grey Rabbit Little Monsters Little Princess Little Red Tractor Little Rosey Little Shop Little Wizards Lizzie McGuire Looney Tunes Lunar Jim M.A.S.K. Madeline Maggie and the Ferocious Beast Magilla Gorilla Maisy Make Way for Noddy Marsupilami Martha Speaks Marvin the Tap-Dancing Horse Mary-Kate and Ashley in Action! Maxie's World Maya the Bee McGee and Me! Meg and Mog Men in Black: The Series Metajets Mew Mew Power Mighty Morphin Power Rangers Mona the Vampire Monchhichis Monster Allergy Monster by Mistake Monster Farm Monster Ranchers Mortal Kombat: Defenders of the Realm Mother Goose and Grimm Motorcity Mousercise Mr. Bogus Mr. Meaty Mummies Alive! Mummy Nanny Muppet Babies My Friend Rabbit My Goldfish is Evil My Little Pony My Little Pony Tales Mythic Warriors: Guardians of the Legend Nanook's Great Hunt Naturally Sadie Ned's Declassified School Survival Guidemi
 Nelvana Specials New Kids on the Block Noah's Island Noddy in Toyland Noozles Ōban Star-Racers Octonauts Old Bear Stories Oscar and Friends Outriders OWL/TV Paddington Bear Specials Paddington Bear Pat and Stan Peanuts Specials Peanuts Pearlie Pelswick Pigeon Street Piggsburg Pigs! Pinky and the Brain Pippi Longstocking Pirates of Dark Water Pixel Pinkie Pocket Dragon Adventures Poddington Peas Pokémon Poko Pole Position Poochini Poppets Town PopPixie Pororo The Little Penguin Postman Pat Special Delivery Service Postman Pat Potamus Park Potterton Films Pound Puppies Power Rangers: Dino Thunder Power Rangers: Ninja Storm Preston Pig Princess Gwenevere and the Jewel Riders Princess Sissi Princess Tenko Project G.e.e.K.e.R. ProStars Pucca Pugwall Pugwall's Summer Rambo: The Force of Freedom Raw Toonage Ready or Not Redwall Renford Rejects Rescue Heroes Rimba's Island Ring Raiders Ripley's Believe It or Not Road Rovers Road to Avonlea Roary the Racing Car RoboCop: The Animated Series Rock 'n Cop Rocket Power Rocko's Modern Life Rocky and the Dodos Rolie Polie Olie RollBots Roswell Conspiracies: Aliens, Myths and Legends Ruby Gloom Rude Dog and the Dweebs Rugrats Rupert Saban's Adventures of Oliver Twist Saban's Adventures of the Little Mermaid Saban's Gulliver's Travels Saber Rider and the Star Sheriffs Scaredy Camp Scaredy Squirrel Science Court Scooby-Doo and Scrappy-Doo Scooby-Doo, Where Are You! Sea Princesses Serious Amazon Serious Jungle Seven Little Monsters Shadow Raiders Sharky & George Sheep in the Big City Shelldon Sherlock Holmes in the 22nd Century SheZow Shoebox Zoo Silver Surfer Sitting Ducks Sky Dancers Sky Trackers Skyland Slim Pig Slimer! And the Real Ghostbusters Sonic Underground Sooty Spartakus and the Sun Beneath the Sea Spectacular Spider-Man Speed Racer: The Next Generation Spellbinder Spider-Man Spider-Man Unlimited Spiral Zone Splicedz
 Sport Billy The Adventures of Spot Star Trek: The Animated Series Star Wars: Droids Star Wars: Ewoks Starcom: The U.S. Space Force Static Shock Stickin' Around Storybook World Strawberry Shortcake Street Sharks Sunkist Kids Super Mario Bros. Super Robot Monkey Team Hyperforce Go! Superbook Superman: The Animated Series Supernormal Swamp Thing Sylvanian Families Sylvester and Tweety Mysteries TaleSpin Taz-Mania Teenage Mutant Ninja Turtles (1987)
 Teenage Mutant Ninja Turtles (2003)
 Teletubbies The Addams Family (1992)
 The Adventures of Grady Greenspace The Adventures of Jimmy Neutron: Boy Genius The Adventures of Pete and Pete The Adventures of Raggedy Ann and Andy The Adventures of Sam & Max: Freelance Police The Adventures of Teddy Ruxpin The Adventures of the Galaxy Rangers The Adventures of Tintin The Amanda Show The Angry Beavers The Animal Shelf The Avengers: United They Stand The Beeps The Berenstain Bears The Biz The Brothers Garcia The California Raisin Show The Care Bears The Charlie Brown and Snoopy Show The Chipmunks Go to the Movies The Country Mouse and the City Mouse Adventures The Dreamstone The Elephant Show The Fairly OddParents! The Fairytaler The Famous Five 
 The Flintstone Kids The Flintstones The Flying House The Forgotten Toys The Further Adventures of SuperTed The Future is Wild The Genie From Down Under The Get Along Gang The Haunted School The Hydronauts The Incredible Hulk (1982)
 The Incredible Hulk (1996)
 The Jetsons The Journey of Allen Strange The Karate Kid The Kids from Room 402 The Kids of Degrassi Street The Lampies The Little Flying Bears The Little Lulu Show The Little Mermaid The Magic Box The Magic School Bus The Magician's House The Mask: Animated Series The Mickey Mouse Club The Mighty Jungle The Miraculous Mellops The Mouse and the Monster The Mouse Factory The Mr. Men Show The Mummy: The Animated Series The Mystery Files of Shelby Woo The Mystic Knights of Tir Na NOg The Neverending Story The New Addams Family The New Adventures of Ocean Girl The New Adventures of Winnie the Pooh The New Adventures of Zorro (1997)
 The New Archies The New Scooby-Doo Mysteries The New Woody Woodpecker Show The Paz Show The Pink Panther The Pinky and Perky Show The Prince of Atlantis The Real Ghostbusters The Ren & Stimpy Show The Rosey and Buddy Show The Save-Ums! The Secret Files of the Spy Dogs The Secret Series The Secret World of Benjamin Bear The Silver Brumby The Smurfs The Telebugs The Tick The Toothbrush Family The Transformers The Trap Door The Wacky World of Tex Avery The Wayne Manifesto The Wiggles The Wild Thornberrys The Wizard of Oz The World of Peter Rabbit and Friends The Wubbulous World of Dr. Seuss The Wuzzles The Zack Files The Zeta Project Theodore Tugboat Thomas the Tank Engine & Friends Thunderbirds Tiny Toon Adventures Toad Patrol Toonsylvania Towser Toxic Crusaders Tracey McBean Twinkle, the Dream Being Twipsy Ultimate Book of Spells Underground Ernie Unfabulous Van Pires Video Power Voltron: The Third Dimension W.I.T.C.H. Wake, Rattle and Roll Walter Melon Watership Down Waynehead We All Have Tales Weird-Oh's Westward Ho! What About Mimi? What-a-Mess What's With Andy? Where's Wally?: The Animated Series Wide-Eye Widget the World Watcher Wiggly Park WildC.A.T.S. Wildfire Willa's Wild Life Wish Kid Wishbone Wonder Why? Worzel Gummidge Down Under Wowser Wunschpunsch Xcalibur X-DuckX X-Men Yakkity Yak Yippee, Yappee and Yahooey Yvon of the Yukon Zak Tales Zoboomafoo Zoobilee Zoo Z-Squad Talk shows 
 The Ellen DeGeneres Show The Phil Donahue Show Sketch shows 
 Smack the Pony Western 
 Lonesome Dove News and current affairs 
 Eye to Eye with Connie Chung Entertainment 
 An Audience with Billy Connolly Education 
 Beyond 2000 Awards Shows 
 Academy Awards Specials 
 Adele One Night Only Friends: The Reunion Oprah with Meghan and HarryLocally produced programming
Present

Past

Awards and live showsAfrica Magic Viewers Choice Awards also known as the AMVCAs. Channel O Music Video Awards also known as the CHOMVAs.Miss South AfricaM-Net Literary Awards"Big Brother Mzansi" the South African version of Big Brother''.
"Big Brother Africa" Continental
"Idols South Africa"
"Power Couple South Africa"
"The Voice South Africa"

See also
DStv
GOtv
MultiChoice
Africa Magic
SuperSport

References

External links
M-Net Channel Website
DStv Channel Website

 
Television stations in South Africa
English-language television stations in South Africa
Television channels and stations established in 1986
Mass media in Johannesburg